Mombasa is a coastal city in southeastern Kenya along the Indian Ocean. It was the first capital of British East Africa, before Nairobi was elevated to capital city status in 1907. It now serves as the capital of Mombasa County. The town is known as "the white and blue city" in Kenya. It is the country's oldest (circa 900 AD) and second-largest city after Nairobi, with a population of about 1,208,333 people according to the 2019 census. Its metropolitan region is the second-largest in the country, and has a population of 3,528,940 people.

Mombasa's location on the Indian Ocean made it a historical trading centre, and it has been controlled by many countries because of its strategic location. Kenyan school history books place the founding of Mombasa as 900 A.D. It must have been already a prosperous trading town in the 12th century, as the Arab geographer al-Idrisi mentions it in 1151. The oldest stone mosque in Mombasa, Mnara, was built  1300. The Mandhry Mosque, built in 1570, has a minaret that contains a regionally specific ogee arch.

In the late pre-colonial period, it was the metropolis of a plantation society, which became dependent on slave labour based around the ivory trade. Throughout the early modern period, Mombasa was a key node in the complex and far reaching Indian Ocean trading networks; its key exports then were ivory, millet, sesamum and coconuts.

Today, Mombasa is a tourism-based town, home to one of the state houses, with an extra-large port and an international airport.

History

Ancient and medieval 
The founding of Mombasa is associated with two rulers: Mwana Mkisi and Shehe Mvita. According to legend, Mwana Mkisi is the original ancestor of Mombasa's oldest lineages within Thenashara Taifa (or Twelve Nations). Families associated with the Twelve Nations are still considered the original inhabitants of the city. Mwana Mkisi was a queen from the pre-Islamic era, who founded Kongowea, the original urban settlement on Mombasa Island.

Significantly, the names of both the queen and the city have linguistic and spiritual connections with Central Africa. "Mkisi" is considered the personification of "ukisi", which means "the holy" in kiKongo. "Kongowea" can similarly be interpreted as the Swahili locative of "kongo", which denotes the essence of civilizational order in central Africa. These legends can be read as an acknowledgment of the Bantu-speaking origins of the Swahili people.

Shehe Mvitaff superseded the dynasty of Mwana Mkisi and established the first permanent stone mosque on Mombasa Island. Mombasa's oldest extant stone mosque, Mnara, was built c. 1300. Shehe Mvita is remembered as a Muslim of great learning and so is connected more directly with the present ideals of Swahili culture that people identify with Mombasa. The ancient history associated with Mwana Mkisi and Shehe Mvita and the founding of an urban settlement on Mombasa Island is still linked to present-day peoples living in Mombasa. The Thenashara Taifa (or Twelve Nations) Swahili lineages recount this ancient history today and are the keepers of local Swahili traditions.

Most of the early information on Mombasa comes from the writings of Portuguese chroniclers in the 16th century.

The famous Moroccan scholar and traveller Ibn Battuta (13041368/1369) visited the area during his travels to the Swahili Coast. He noted the city, although he stayed only one night. He wrote that the people of Mombasa were Shafi‘i Muslims, religious people, trustworthy and righteous. Their mosques were made of wood, expertly built.

The exact founding date of the city is unknown, but it has a long history. Kenyan school history books place the founding of Mombasa as 900 A.D. It must have been already a prosperous trading town in the 12th century, as the Arab geographer al-Idrisi mentions it in 1151. The oldest stone mosque in Mombasa, Mnara, was built  1300. The Mandhry Mosque, built in 1570, has a minaret that contains a regionally specific ogee arch. This suggests that Swahili architecture was an indigenous African product rather than being adopted from non-African Muslims who brought stone architecture to the Swahili Coast.

During the pre-modern period, Mombasa was an important centre for the trade in spices, gold, and ivory. Its trade links reached as far as India and China. Oral historians today can still recount this period of local history. Indian history shows that there were trade links between Mombasa and Cholas of South India. Throughout the early modern period, Mombasa was a key node in the complex and far-reaching Indian Ocean trading networks, its key exports then were ivory, millet, sesamum and coconuts.

Ivory caravans remained a major source of economic prosperity. Mombasa became the major port city of pre-colonial Kenya in the Middle Ages and was used to trade with other African port cities, the Persian Empire, the Arabian Peninsula, India and China.

Sixteenth-century Portuguese voyager Duarte Barbosa wrote, 
"[Mombasa] is a place of great traffic and has a good harbour in which there are always moored small craft of many kinds and also great ships, both of which are bound from Sofala and others which come from Cambay and Melinde and others which sail to the island of Zanzibar."

Portuguese domination

Vasco da Gama was the first known European to visit Mombasa, receiving a chilly reception in 1498. Two years later, the town was sacked by the Portuguese. In 1502, the sultanate became independent from Kilwa Kisiwani and was renamed as Mvita (in Swahili) or Manbasa (Arabic).

The Portuguese had since had encounters with the city several times; first under Tristão da Cunha in 1506, later under Afonso de Albuquerque in 1522 to quell an attempted mutiny by the sultan's nephew in Pemba and Zanzibar, and finally the destruction of the city under Nuno da Cunha again in 1528 after the Malindi sultan failed to pay tribute.

In 1585, a joint military expedition between the Somalis of Ajuran Empire and the Turks of the Ottoman Empire, led by Emir 'Ali Bey, successfully captured Mombasa, and other coastal cities in Southeast Africa from the Portuguese. However, Malindi remained loyal to Portugal. The Zimba overcame the towns of Sena and Tete on the Zambezi, and in 1587 they took Kilwa, killing 3,000 people. At Mombasa, the Zimba slaughtered the Muslim inhabitants, but they were halted at Malindi by the Bantu-speaking Segeju and went home. This stimulated the Portuguese to take over Mombasa a third time in 1589, and four years later they built Fort Jesus to administer the region. Between Lake Malawi and the Zambezi mouth, Kalonga Mzura made an alliance with the Portuguese in 1608 and fielded 4,000 warriors to help defeat their rival Zimba, who were led by chief Lundi.

After the building of Fort Jesus, Mombasa was put by the Portuguese under the rule of members of the ruling family of Malindi. In 1631 Dom Jeronimo the ruler of Mombasa slaughtered the Portuguese garrison in the city and defeated the relief force sent by the Portuguese. In 1632 Dom Jeronimo left Mombasa and became a pirate. That year the Portuguese returned and established direct rule over Mombasa.

Omani rule
With the capture of Fort Jesus in 1698, the town came under the influence of the Imamate of Oman, subordinate to the Omani rulers on the island of Unguja, prompting regular local rebellions. Oman appointed three consecutive Governors (Wali in Arabic, Liwali in Swahili):
12 December 1698 – December 1698: Imam Sa'if ibn Sultan
December 1698 – 1728: Nasr ibn Abdallah al-Mazru'i
1728–12 March 1728: Shaykh Rumba

Mombasa was briefly returned to Portuguese rule by captain-major Álvaro Caetano de Melo Castro (12 March 1728 – 21 September 1729), then four new Omani Liwali until 1746, when the last of them made it independent again (disputed by Oman), as the first of its recorded Sultans:
1746–1755: 'Ali ibn Uthman al-Mazru'i
1755–1773: Masud ibn Nasr al-Mazru'i
1773–1782: Abdallah ibn Muhammad al-Mazru'i
1782–1811: Ahmad ibn Muhammad al-Mazru'i (born 17–died 1814)
1812–1823: 'Abdallah ibn Ahmad al-Mazru'i (died 1823)
1823–1826: Sulayman ibn 'Ali al-Mazru'i

From 9 February 1824 to 25 July 1826, there was a British protectorate over Mombasa, represented by governors. Omani rule was restored in 1826; seven  where appointed. On 24 June 1837, it was nominally annexed by Said bin Sultan of Muscat and Oman.

British rule and independence

On 25 May 1887 Mombasa was relinquished to the British East Africa Association, later the Imperial British East Africa Company. It came under British administration in 1895.
It soon became the capital of the British East Africa Protectorate and the sea terminal of the Uganda Railway, construction of which was started in 1896. Many workers were brought in from British India to build the railway, and the city's fortunes revived. The Sultan of Zanzibar formally presented the town to the British in 1898.

Mombasa became the capital of the Kenya Colony Protectorate of Kenya, sometime between 1887 and around 1906. The capital was later moved because medical officers warned that the ground was swampy, and urged Sir James Hayes Sadler, then Commissioner of the East Africa Protectorate, to plead with London to move the town elsewhere to mitigate potential disease. Nairobi has since been Kenya's capital to date.

The Mombasa tusks, one of the city's best-known monuments, were originally constructed in 1952 by the British administration of the Kenya Colony, commemorating the visit of Queen Elizabeth II to the city.

In 2018, as part of an effort to increase tourism, Mombasa County Governor Hassan Joho issued a directive requiring that all buildings in the Old Town and the Central Business District be painted white with Egyptian blue trim and banned all signs from their walls or canopies. Transport, Infrastructure and Public Works County Executive Tawfiq Balala stated that the city wanted to be "the most photographed in Africa."

Geography 

Being a coastal town, Mombasa is characterised by a flat topography. The town of Mombasa is centred on Mombasa Island, but extends to the mainland. The island is separated from the mainland by two creeks, Port Reitz in the south and Tudor Creek in the north.

Climate 
Mombasa has a tropical wet and dry climate (Köppen: As). The amount of rainfall essentially depends on the season. The rainiest months are April and May, while rainfall is minimal between January and February.

Located near the equator, Mombasa has only a slight seasonal temperature variation, with high temperatures ranging .

As a seaport, Mombasa is subject to detrimental consequences of a fluctuating climate. In October 2006, Mombasa experienced a large flood that affected 60,000 people.

Like the rest of Kenya, climate change is already creating challenges for the city: coastal erosion has become a problem for infrastructure in Mombasa. This has increased the number of annual floods.

Suburbs 

Mombasa is located on Mombasa Island and sprawls to the surrounding mainlands. The island is separated from the mainland by two creeks: Tudor Creek and Kilindini Harbour. It is connected to the mainland to the north by the Nyali Bridge, to the south by the Likoni Ferry, and to the west by the Makupa Causeway, alongside which runs the Kenya-Uganda Railway. The port serves both Kenya and countries of the interior, linking them to the ocean. The city is served by Moi International Airport located in the northwest mainland suburb of Chaani.

Mombasa Island 

Mombasa CBD

Kizingo: Considered the prime residential area of Mombasa. The State House of Mombasa, Provincial Headquarters, The Mombasa Law Courts, and the Municipal Council are located in Kizingo. The Aga Khan Academy, Aga Khan High School, Serani Primary School, Serani High School, Santokben Nursery School, Coast Academy, Jaffery Academy, Mombasa Primary School, Loreto Convent, Mama Ngina Girls' High School and the Government Training Institute (GTI) Mombasa are all in Kizingo as well.

Central Business District: The Mombasa central business district across the TSS building roundabout, Moi Avenue, and Nyerere Avenue is densely populated. Organizations such as the Kenya Revenue Authority (KRA) and businesses such as Banks (ABSA, I&M Ltd, Bank of India Ltd), Insurance Firms (Nomura Insurance Brokers, Masumali Meghji Insurance), and Audit Firms (Anant Bhatt LLP, Pricewaterhouse Coopers LLP, Mazars LLP, Deloitte LLP, and PKF LLP) are located here.

Kibokoni: Part of Old Town with Swahili architecture. Fort Jesus is in Baghani.

Englani: Part of Old town between Kibokoni and Makadara.

Kuze: Part of Old Town with Swahili culture and architecture. Originally flourishing with Swahili people but currently becoming a more cosmopolitan neighbourhood.

Makadara: Part of Old Town consisting of a high number of descendants of Baluchi former soldiers who settled within this area before it developed into a town. The name is derived from the Arabic words "Qadru r-Rahman" meaning "Decree of (God) the Merciful".

Ganjoni: Primarily a middle class residential, home of second biggest dry dock of Africa after the one in South Africa.

Tudor: Another middle class residential area with homes and shops. The Technical University of Mombasa (TUM) is situated in this neighbourhood.

North Coast 

Nyali, also considered a prime and up-market residential area, it is on the mainland north of the island and is linked by the New Nyali Bridge. It has numerous beach front hotels in the area known as the "North Coast". Nyali has two distinct sections – the upmarket Old Nyali and the upcoming New Nyali. For many residents, Nyali has now become a self-contained residential area, with two Nakumatts, a multiplex cinema, shopping malls, banks, schools and post offices. This often eliminates the need for residents to cross the bridge and to go into the congested Mombasa city centre. Nyali is home for the Nyali Cinemax complex, Mamba Village, the Nyali Golf Club, and some of the most prestigious academic institutions of the Coast Province.

Kongowea is a densely populated area with 15 villages, two sub-locations and an estimated population of 106,180 residents. Kongowea is a cosmopolitan settlement mainly inhabited by people from mainland who migrated into the city in search of employment, mainly in service and manufacturing sector. The area is adjacent to the rich suburb of Nyali which employs a portion of the village residents. They are mainly hired as cheap labour as watchmen, gardeners, masons for up coming houses and house help. The most well known villages inside Kongowea include Kisumu Ndogo, Shauri Yako and Mnazi Mmoja, despite being located in this prime area, many residents live under extreme conditions – poor sanitation, high crime rate and lack of basic essential amenities like schools, hospitals and tap water. Kongowea is also home to one of the largest open-air markets in the African Great Lakes.

Bamburi is an outlying township (fifteen minutes drive) along the Malindi road. It is home to Bamburi Cement factory, the largest cement plant in the East African region. Other notable features in the area are the Jomo Kenyatta public beach, commonly known as Pirates, and Haller Park, a nature trail and wildlife conservatory. Kiembeni Estate, also in the Bamburi area, hosts around 100,000 residents. The estate has its own supermarket, several retail shops, salons and boutiques, and a number of licensed drinking dens. The establishments include The Shilla Bar, Turkey Base, Stars Garden and Sensera pub. Kiembeni is arguably the largest estate in Mombasa, and growing even faster.

Other areas include, Shanzu, Mkomani, Bombolulu, Kisauni and, across the Mtwapa creek, the popular area of Mtwapa, which is already located in Kilifi county.

The North Coast has an entertainment industry which attracts locals and tourists.

South Coast 

Likoni: is a lower income and lower-middle-class neighbourhood connected to Mombasa Island by ferry. It is south of Mombasa Island and made up of mostly Swahili and non-Swahili Bantu tribes. The ferry was the target of the Likoni Riots of 1997.

Diani Beach: a beach resort area situated over the Likoni Ferry on the south coast of Mombasa. It is located some 36 km (22 miles) south of Mombasa city on the mainland coast and is a prime resort for many local and international tourists. Diani Beach has an airport at Ukunda town to cater for tourists who fly there directly from Nairobi Wilson or any other airports and airfields in the country.

Mombasa Mainland 

Magongo: is an outlying township 20 minutes driving distance northwest of Mombasa Island, situated on the Nairobi Highway. This fringe community lacks any effective electricity, water or sewer systems, with a general lack of infrastructure. Poverty, lack of sanitation, and unemployment continue to be the greatest issues for the Mikindani Township, which have ensured low health and safety standards for its residents. Poor, lower class housing is widespread, ranging from simple stone, two-storey structures to mud and earth homes fitted with corrugated iron roofs. Much of the community works outside of the township, within Mombasa Island itself as there is a lack of employment and industry. There are number of small health clinics, shops, and a few public primary schools: Nazarene primary is one school, which is known in particular as being staffed by a revolving volunteer teacher base from Western, and predominately English speaking nations. This small town serves as a link between the city and Moi International Airport. Magongo is also home to the Akamba Handicraft Cooperative.

Mikindani, a suburban area: This is an outlying township on the mainland along the Nairobi Highway. It is built in the heavy industrial sections of Changamwe and mainly accommodate the working class who either work in the industries, the town centre on the Island and the Port at Kilindini harbour.

Miritini: outlying township on the Mombasa Nairobi Highway which is first growing as a suburban area.

Changamwe: Industrial area which contains the Kipevu power generation projects, the Kenya Oil Refinery Company facility and housing estates such as Chaani and is the gateway to the Moi International Airport. The area has administrative offices of the D.O and the chiefs who serve the administrative division.

Migadini & Chaani: They are two adjacent estate that are located east of Airport road and east of Kenya Port Authority. They are bordered by Port Reitz, Magongo and KPA

Port Reitz: Is a suburb on the mainland which contains a beach, oil refineries, housing estates etc. Moi International Airport and the Port Reitz District Hospital are in Port Reitz.

Demography 

Mombasa city has a population of 1,208,333 per the 2019 census.

Mombasa has a cosmopolitan population, with the Swahili people and Mijikenda predominant. Other communities include the Akamba and Taita Bantus as well as a significant population of Luo and Luhya. Gusii, Agikuyu, peoples from Western Kenya. The major religions practised in the city are Christianity and Islam. Over the centuries, many immigrants and traders have settled in Mombasa, particularly from the Middle East and South Asia.

Religion in Mombasa

Economy 

Mombasa is an important economic centre in Kenya. In addition to the coffee trade, the food and chemical industries, there is a steel mill, an aluminum rolling mill, an oil refinery and a cement plant. The city is home to the most important seaport in East Africa, Kilindini Harbor, which is also used by the neighboring countries Tanzania and Uganda for their imports and exports.

Kilindini is an old Swahili term meaning "deep". The port is so-called because the channel is naturally very deep. Kilindini Harbour is an example of a natural geographic phenomenon called a ria, formed at the end of the last glacial period when the sea level rose and engulfed a river that was flowing from the mainland.

Mombasa is a centre of coastal tourism in Kenya. Mombasa Island itself is not a main attraction, although many people visit the Old Town and Fort Jesus. The Nyali, Bamburi, and Shanzu beaches are located north of the city. The Shelly, Tiwi, and Diani beaches are located south of Mombasa. Several luxury hotels exist on these beaches, while the less expensive hotels are located further away.

Mombasa's northern shoreline is renowned for its vibrant 24-hour entertainment offers, including both family entertainment (water parks, cinemas, bowling, etc.), sports (watersports, mountain biking and gokarting), culinary offers (restaurants offering a wide range of specialties from Kenya, China, Japan, India, Italy, Germany and other countries) and nightlife (bars, pubs, clubs, discothèques, etc.).

Other local industries include an oil refinery with a capacity of  a day, and a cement factory capable of producing over 1.1 million tons per year. The major intercontinental undersea telecom cables reach shore next to Mombasa, connecting the African Great Lakes to the rest of the world and supporting a fast-growing call centre business in the area. The estimated real GDP growth for Kenya in 2016 is 5.7-6.0%. This growth will be in response to the construction of a railway system from Nairobi to Mombasa which will aid in trade and transportation between Kenya's two major cities.

Mombasa will become a Special Economic Zone (SEZ) in which certain industries such as tea, garments, and footwear will be exempt from certain taxes to promote domestic growth. This is in response to the deficiencies in Export Processing Zones (EPZ).

The Kenyan Dock Worker's Union is situated in Mombasa and has roughly 5,000 members.

President Kenyatta has made it a priority to deepen economic ties with Asia at the onset of his presidency. Japan has played a role in financially sponsoring the expansion of the Mombasa port in phase one and two of the expansion project.

At 44%, the rate of youth unemployment in Mombasa is more than double the national average of 21% (2016).

Transport

Air 

Moi International Airport is located in the city of Mombasa, and is the second largest airport in Kenya with daily flights to Nairobi and other Kenyan, European and Middle Eastern destinations. The airport also handles a large amount of air cargo through its freight terminal.

Rail 

Mombasa currently has a modern railway station on the Mombasa–Nairobi Standard Gauge Railway that replaced the narrow-gauge Uganda Railway completed in 1901 under British colonial rule. Completed in 2017 and located at Miritini, the Mombasa Terminus station links Mombasa to Nairobi. The station, situated about 20 kilometers from the city centre, is accessible through the newly built (2018) highway, being the first phase of the Dongo Kundu bypass. Kenya Railways transports passengers and cargo through the Standard Gauge Railway between Nairobi to Mombasa.

Road 

Driving in Mombasa is straightforward and the majority of the roads are tarmacked. The Mombasa–Nairobi Expressway connects Mombasa to the capital city Nairobi.

Within Mombasa, most local people use matatus (mini-buses) which are extremely common in Kenya, to move around the city and its suburbs. The tuk-tuk—a motor vehicle with three wheels—is widely used as transport around the city and its suburbs. No more than three passengers may be carried. A boda-boda is originally a bicycle taxi but have long since been replaced by motorcycles.

Sea 

The port of Mombasa is the largest in East Africa, with 19 deep water berths with two additional berths nearing completion and two oil terminals. The port is connected by rail and road to the interior. At present there is little or no scheduled passenger service from the port, however, international cruise ships frequent the port. The port is part of the 21st Century Maritime Silk Road that runs from the Chinese coast to the Upper Adriatic region. In connection with the Silk Road Initiative, China has started infrastructure development projects in Kenya and is building roads, railways and public buildings on credit.

Ferry 

There is no bridge between Mombasa Island and the south coast, instead the route is served by ferries operated by the Kenya Ferry Service from Kilindini and Mtongwe to Likoni in the south coast of Mombasa. The last major accident occurred in 1994 when a ferry serving Mtongwe route sank killing more than 270 people.

As a result of the increase in more luxurious hotels along the south coast and a lack of a direct bridge linking with Mombasa island, visiting tourists have the option of flying directly from Nairobi into the South Coast airstrip at Ukunda.

The Dongo Kundu Bypass Highway is currently (2018) under construction. With a total of three bridges, it will finally connect the mainland to the south coast easing the burden on the ferry services. Mombasa Gate Bridge will connect the mainland to likoni,this will eliminate the usage of the unsafe ferry which has claimed hundreds of lives.

Education 
The major university in the island is the Technical University of Mombasa.
The city has a campus of Kenyatta University.
Other major university campuses include University of Nairobi-Mombasa campus, Mount Kenya University-Mombasa campus, JKUAT-Mombasa, Shanzu Teachers Training College, Mombasa Technical College, Bandari college, Utalii college, and ICS college Mombasa.

Places of worship 

Mombasa has places of worship serving needs of the city's diverse communities. Christian denominations represented in the city include:
Roman Catholic Archdiocese of Mombasa with Holy Ghost Cathedral, Mombasa as the main church
Anglican Church of Kenya (Anglican Communion), with Mombasa Anglican Cathedral Church as the main church
Presbyterian Church of East Africa 
(World Communion of Reformed Churches), 
Baptist Convention of Kenya (Baptist World Alliance), 
Assemblies of God. 
There are also many Hindu Hinduism temples  and Muslim mosques.
A large number of Hindus visit Mombasa to pray at a number of naturally formed Lingam that have formed in the Nyali beach Gombeshwar Caves. According to local folklore, the cave-temple was found a long time ago when a group of local herders were puzzled after they noticed that one of their cows regularly released all of her milk at a specific yet random spot on the hills. They are then said to have approached some Hindu families living in the area to ask if they had any idea behind the strange behaviour by the cow. The group then teamed up, made their way to the spot and started digging. That is how they ended up stumbling into the cave where they found a 'Shiva Lingam' – an abstract representation of the Hindu God Lord Shiva, whose vehicle is Nandi (mythology). Hindus worship Lord Shiva by offering milk to a Lingam.
List of Hindu Temples in Mombasa:
Hindu Union of Mombasa - Shivalaay (Makadara)
Hindu Union of Mombasa - Gombeshwar (Nyali)
Shree Ganesha Temple - Nyali
Shree Ramdev Pir Temple - Nyali
Shree Dwarikadham Hare Krishna Temple (ISKON) - Nyali
Shree BAPS Swaminarayan Temple - Mombasa Mainland
Shree Gayatri Brahm Samaj Temple - Mombasa Mainland
Shree Cutch Satsang Swaminarayan Temple - Mombasa Mainland
Shree Radhe-Krishna Makupa Temple - Mombasa Mainland
Shree Vishwakarma Temple - Mombasa Mainland
Other temples within Mombasa include the Sikh Shree Guru Gobind Singh Sabha Temple, and the Shree Parshva Vallabh Jain Temple

Culture 

A major cultural hub in Kenya and the African Great Lakes, Mombasa's proximity to Zanzibar, Nairobi and the Indian subcontinent, as well as its large shipping and maritime industries gives it a diverse mosaic of cultures. Music is a main feature of Mombasa's culture.

Music 
Taarab music, which originates from Zanzibar, has a prominent local presence. Styles of music native to Mombasa include the smooth and mellow Bango, fast-paced Chakacha and traditional Mwanzele.

Musicians of note are Mombasa Roots, Safari Sounds, Them Mushrooms, Prof Juma Bhalo, Maulidi Juma, Zuhura Swaleh, Zein Alabdin and Princess Farida. Mombasa has been the home or base for former greats like Fundi Konde, known for his song "Tausi"; Fadhili Williams and Grand Charo, famous for the song "Malaika"; Sal Davies; Malika Mohammed; Stara Butte; Juma Bhalo. Contemporary hip-hop fusion artistes are Susumila, Majizee, Nyota Ndogo, Cannibal (musician), Sharama and Ukoo Flani super group which once could boast up to 40 rappers.

Recently, hip hop, reggae, soul, blues, salsa and (among the Indian community) bhangra have become popular, especially amongst the youth. Mombasa is mainly a tourism centre populated by hundreds of entertainment spots of all categories from night clubs, bars, hotels, fancy restaurants and many more. It has the most vibrant night life in Kenya catering to the mainly tourist population.

Sports 
Currently, Mombasa is represented in the Kenyan Premier League by Bandari F.C, which plays at the Mbaraki Sports Grounds. Also, the Congo United FC, Promoted and dropped in 2011, are in the second tier Nationwide Super League with 4 other hometown clubs – Admiral F.C.; Magongo Rangers; Sparki Youth and Coast United. Derbies between Mombasa teams have become intriguing affairs recently. Another team, Coast Stars, were relegated several years ago from the league. The only Mombasa-based team to win the league is Feisal F.C., the 1965 champions. Kiziwi leopards was a popular team in the 1980s as was Mombasa Wanderers decades before. There are several cricket teams in Mombasa; one is Mombasa Sports Club (MSC), whose ground was given ODI status in 2006. MSC has also a rugby union team playing in the Kenya Cup League, the premier rugby competition in Kenya. Mvita XI men and MSC ladies represent Mombasa in Kenyan field hockey leagues.

Mombasa is represented in the nationwide rugby league by Mombasa RFC. The city is also host to a leg of the national rugby sevens circuit, being one of only six city hosts. The Mombasa leg is referred to as the Driftwood sevens, and the annual tournament is extremely popular, attracting thousands of fans from across the country.

The 2007 World Cross Country Championships were held in Mombasa. Mombasa Marathon is competed annually in Mombasa. The town also hosts the biennial classic edition of Safari Rally and annually a Kenya National Rally Championship round.

Scuba diving takes place mostly within the Mombasa Marine National Park and Reserve, which is managed and maintained by Kenya Wildlife Service.

Twin towns – sister cities

Mombasa is twinned with:

 Durban, South Africa (2012)
 Guangzhou, China (2018)
 Honolulu, United States (2008)
 Long Beach, United States (2007)
 Seattle, United States (1981)

Notable people 
During its history, Mombasa was visited by numerous pioneers of the maritime exploration, such as the Arabs Al Idrissi (1151) and Ibn Battuta (1330) or the Portuguese Vasco da Gama (1498), Pedro Álvares Cabral (1500) João da Nova (1505) and Afonso de Albuquerque (1507).

 Abdilatif Abdalla, writer, university professor and political protestor
 Karen Blixen, Danish novelist
 Mercedes Iman Diamond, drag queen and contestant on the eleventh season of RuPaul's Drag Race
 Timothy R. McClanahan, marine ecologist who lived and has worked in Mombasa since 1991
 Swaleh Nguru, Arab businessman, conservationist and philanthropist
 Thomas Risley Odhiambo, entomologist
 Ayub Ogada, musician, singer and composer known for having composed two songs for the movie The Constant Gardener
 Fadhili William, musician, singer, and composer

Gallery

In popular culture 
Mombasa is the subject of the popular song and music video of the same name, "Mombasa" by Jabali Afrika feat. Jason Dunford aka Samaki Mkuu released on July 17, 2020.

In the film Out of Africa, Mombasa is the train destination as the seaport for voyages to Europe via the Suez Canal, and Mombasa is indicated as downriver ("This water must go home to Mombasa").

Mombasa is a pivotal setting in the highly popular Halo video game series. Mombasa appears as a major setting in Halo 2, and the entirety of Halo 3: ODST takes place in Mombasa. The science fiction games are set in the year 2552, and the city has been divided into "Old Mombasa" and "New Mombasa" (a prosperous section filled with futuristic skyscrapers and an iconic orbital elevator). It is the capital of the fictional East Africa Protectorate. The city comes under attack by humanity's alien adversaries, "The Covenant", who focus their planetary invasion in and around Mombasa in search of a massive, technologically advanced artifact buried nearby.

Mombasa is featured in the 2010 movie, Inception, where Cobb meets Eames and Yusuf before the job takes place.

In the Warren Zevon song "Roland the Headless Thompson Gunner", Mombasa is one of the key locales related to the protagonist's quest.

The Finnish pop hit "Mombasa" (by Taiska) is about the city.

In the US, the Walt Disney World resort recreated a Kenyan village in the Africa section of the Disney's Animal Kingdom theme park named "Harambe", which is modelled after Mombasa. The village features a store called the "Mombasa Marketplace".

In the Indian movie Mr. India, Mombasa is mentioned in the popular song "Hawa Hawaii".

The Indian Bollywood movie Company was partly shot in Mombasa.

Most of the events in the 2017 story "Consummation in Mombasa" (by Andrei Gusev) take place in Mombasa and in the nearest district Mtwapa.

One-Way Ticket to Mombasa (Menolippu Mombasaan) is a 2002 Finnish film directed by Hannu Tuomainen.

Popular blackgaze band Deafheaven titled the last song of its 2021 album, Infinite Granite, with the name of the city. The lyrics make reference to the beaches and general uplifting scenery of Mombasa.

See also 

 Ngomongo Villages

References

Bibliography

External links 

 Mombasa County Government

 
Populated coastal places in Kenya
Populated places in Coast Province
County capitals in Kenya
Former British colonies and protectorates in Africa
Former Portuguese colonies
Mombasa County
Port cities in Africa
Port cities and towns of the Indian Ocean
Swahili city-states
1824 establishments in the British Empire